Melanella chydaea is a species of sea snail, a marine gastropod mollusk in the family Eulimidae. The species is one of many species known to exist within the genus, Melanella.

Description 
The maximum recorded shell length is 3.8 mm.

Habitat 
Minimum recorded depth is 713 m. Maximum recorded depth is 713 m.

References

External links

chydaea
Gastropods described in 1883